Baltiyskaya is a station on the Kirovsko-Vyborgskaya Line of the Saint Petersburg Metro, located between Narvskaya and Tekhnologichesky Institut.

Baltiyskaya is an underground bore-tunnel tri-span station with one exit and middle tunnel of full length. It is situated  under surface level. The exit feeds into Baltiysky Rail Terminal building. A second exit, which will lead from the opposite side of the underground platform, is also planned. For the decoration of the station Ural marble was used, representing the silver colour of the sea. Baltiyskaya station was opened on 15 November 1955 as the first part of Saint Petersburg's metro system. The project name for the station had been Baltiyskiy Vokzal.

Gallery

Saint Petersburg Metro stations
Railway stations in Russia opened in 1955
Railway stations located underground in Russia
Cultural heritage monuments of regional significance in Saint Petersburg